Benedetto Pagni (died 1578) was an Italian painter of the Mannerist period, active mainly in Mantua and Pescia. He was part of the team of assistants of Giulio Romano in the decoration of the Palazzo del Te. He painted a Martyrdom of San Lorenzo for the Basilica of Sant'Andrea in Mantua. He painted a Marriage of Cana for the cathedral in Pescia.

References

1578 deaths
People from Pescia
16th-century Italian painters
Italian male painters
Painters from Mantua
Italian Mannerist painters
Italian Renaissance painters
Year of birth unknown